Lindy Cameron Ruff (born February 17, 1960) is a Canadian professional ice hockey coach who is the head coach for the New Jersey Devils of the National Hockey League (NHL). Ruff was previously the head coach of the Dallas Stars of the NHL, and also the head coach of the Buffalo Sabres from 1997 to 2013, with whom he won the Jack Adams Award in 2006. During his playing career, Ruff played in the NHL for the Sabres and New York Rangers, the former of which he captained.

Ruff was an assistant coach for the Canadian national team at the 2014 Winter Olympics.

Playing career
Ruff was chosen in the second round, 32nd overall, of the 1979 NHL Entry Draft, by the Buffalo Sabres. He played for the Sabres and New York Rangers. Ruff gained a reputation as a player for his toughness, character and hard work on the ice. An illustration of this came in a May 10, 1980, playoff game against the New York Islanders, when opposing goaltender Billy Smith struck Ruff with his stick as he passed in front of his net. Ruff got up, skated back to the goaltender and tackled him.

Ruff played most of his NHL career for the Sabres, serving as captain of the team for nearly three years, but he was traded to the Rangers at the 1989 NHL trade deadline in exchange for a draft pick. The Sabres would use that pick to select Richard Šmehlík, who would later play for several years under Ruff.

Ruff played in 691 NHL games, scoring 105 goals and adding 195 assists for a total of 300 points. He also recorded 1,264 penalty minutes. In 52 playoff games, Ruff recorded 11 goals and 13 assists while accumulating 193 penalty minutes.

Coaching career

Assistant coach
Ruff became assistant coach of the Florida Panthers for the 1993–94 season until the 1996–97 season. His greatest success as an assistant coach was with the 1995–96 Florida Panthers, who made it to the Stanley Cup Finals, but lost to the Colorado Avalanche in a four game sweep.

Buffalo Sabres
Ruff was named the 15th head coach of the Buffalo Sabres on July 21, 1997. He joined a long list of former Sabres players who eventually became Sabres head coaches: Floyd Smith, Bill Inglis, Craig Ramsay, Jim Schoenfeld and Rick Dudley. He had immediate success in Buffalo, advancing to the Eastern Conference Finals in the 1997–98 season. 

In Ruff's second season as coach, the Sabres reached the 1999 Stanley Cup Finals before losing to the Dallas Stars in six games. The Stars' Brett Hull scored a goal deep into the third overtime. The following two seasons saw Ruff's Sabres lose in the first round to the Philadelphia Flyers and the second round to the Pittsburgh Penguins, respectively.

Buffalo missed the playoffs in the three seasons preceding the 2004–05 NHL lockout amidst the team's bankruptcy and financial problems caused by the Adelphia Communications corporate scandal. After the lockout, Ruff led the Sabres to back-to-back Eastern Conference Finals appearances only to lose to the Carolina Hurricanes in 2006 and the Ottawa Senators in 2007. Ruff was the longest-tenured coach in the NHL and was rewarded with a three-year contract extension that had an option for a fourth season.

Ruff is known for being blunt with the media. A well-known example of his bluntness were his comments regarding Toronto Maple Leafs player Darcy Tucker. In his post-game interview following a questionable hit on Jochen Hecht, that knocked the Sabres centre out of the lineup for two weeks with a sprained ACL in the 2005–06 season, Ruff said, "I want him [Tucker] suspended." He also said, "I have not called the NHL office all year and I will call them ten times tomorrow." He called Tucker's hit "an absolute joke".

On April 5, 2006, Ruff became the 31st coach in NHL history to win 300 games, and just the 16th to do so with only one team. Ruff led the Sabres to their most successful regular season ever in 2006–07 with a 53–22–7 record for a total of 113 points.

Ruff was the winner of the 2005–06 Jack Adams Award for coach of the year in the NHL. Tom Renney of the New York Rangers and Peter Laviolette of the Carolina Hurricanes were also nominated.

Ruff was again nominated for the Jack Adams Award in 2006–07. His nomination was the second time he has been a finalist for coach of the year. Alain Vigneault of the Vancouver Canucks won the honour; Ruff placed second in voting with 126 points to Vigneault's 134.

In February 2007, Ruff was fined US$10,000 by the NHL after a brawl with the Ottawa Senators. The NHL said Ruff precipitated the brawl following a questionable hit on then co-captain Chris Drury by the Senators' Chris Neil. Because the hit to Drury did not result in a penalty, Ruff sent out Andrew Peters, Patrick Kaleta and Adam Mair, the team's "enforcers". What followed was one of the 2006–07 season's most memorable hockey brawls. Mair began the brawl, punching Ottawa's Jason Spezza as soon as the puck was dropped. Peters tried to start a fight with Dany Heatley, who was reluctant to respond, at one point even hiding behind a linesman. The goaltenders also entered the fight, with Martin Biron challenging Ray Emery, and Ruff himself engaged in a prolonged shouting match with Senators head coach Bryan Murray. A large contingent of Sabres fans attempted to raise money to pay the fine on Ruff's behalf. Ruff declined the fans' offer and had the money raised donated to charity.

After a second round playoff match against the New York Rangers on April 27, 2007, Ruff would be fined again by the NHL after harshly criticizing officials for an alleged missed too-many-men call against the Rangers, which might have given Buffalo a chance to tie the match in the closing minute.

In the 2006–07 season, Ruff became the first Sabres coach to lead the team to back-to-back 50-win seasons, boasting the fifth-best points percentage in the NHL since 1979.

On October 15, 2008, Ruff became the 23rd coach in NHL history to win 400 games, and just the seventh to win 400 games for one team.

Ruff was named as an associate coach for Canada, which won the gold medal at the 2010 Winter Olympics in Vancouver.

On January 6, 2011, Ruff became only the 16th coach in NHL history to win 500 games, and just the second to win 500 games while only having coached one team.

On January 8, 2011, Ruff became the winningest coach who only coached for one team in NHL history when the Sabres defeated the Phoenix Coyotes 2–1 in overtime. His 501st win behind the bench with the Sabres put him one ahead of Toe Blake, who coached to 500 wins with the Montreal Canadiens. Al Arbour won more games for the New York Islanders, but he also coached the St. Louis Blues early in his career. Along with Arbour, Billy Reay and current New York Islanders coach Barry Trotz, Ruff is one of just four coaches to coach 1,000 NHL games with a single team.

On April 29, 2011, the Sabres announced Ruff had agreed to a multiple year contract extension.

On February 20, 2013, the Sabres announced Ruff had been relieved of his coaching duties, ending his tenure as the NHL's longest active-serving coach with one team and second only to Gregg Popovich in the four major sports in North America. Ron Rolston, head coach of the American Hockey League's Rochester Americans, was named as his replacement.

Dallas Stars
On June 20, 2013, the Dallas Stars announced they were in the process of hiring Ruff as head coach. This was also on the anniversary of the controversial defeat of the Sabres in the Stanley Cup Finals in 1999. On June 21, 2013, the Stars announced Ruff would be their new head coach.

In 2014, Ruff led the Stars to their first playoff appearance since 2008, but lost in the opening round to the Anaheim Ducks in six games. Ruff served as the head coach of the Central Division squad in the 2015–16 All-Star Game.

On April 9, 2017, the Stars announced Ruff would not return as head coach for the 2017–18 season.

New York Rangers
On July 10, 2017, it was announced Ruff was named as assistant coach of the New York Rangers.

New Jersey Devils
On July 9, 2020, Ruff was named head coach of the New Jersey Devils. On January 28, 2021, Ruff coached his 1,500th game in the NHL as the Devils lost 3–1 to the Philadelphia Flyers. The Devils had been engaged in a rebuilding phase in the leadup to Ruff's hiring, with the expectation that they would soon compete for the playoffs again, but the team continued to struggle during his first two seasons with the team, finishing near the bottom of the standings in each. The 2021–22 season had begun with some hopes based on offseason acquisitions and the maturation of young star players, but the team was plagued by injuries, using a franchise record seven different goaltenders over its 82 games.

Questions continued to surround Ruff's job security heading into the 2022–23 season, with some suspecting that the hiring of former Florida Panthers coach and Jack Adams Award finalist Andrew Brunette as an assistant coach presaged him replacing Ruff at some point in the season. After the Devils lost their first two games of the season in a manner much resembling the prior years, chants of "Fire Lindy!" broke out at the Prudential Center. However, the team's fortunes changed rapidly, and by the end of October they were embarking on a lengthy winning streak that would carry them into first place in the Metropolitan Division. On November 12, after a 4–2 victory over the Arizona Coyotes, the team's ninth consecutive, the audience chanted "Sorry Lindy!" Ruff said afterward "I accept the apology and maybe one day we can all sit down and have a beer and laugh about it." The team's winning streaking would ultimately extend to 13 games, equaling the franchise record. On November 26, 2022, Ruff became the fifth NHL coach to win 800 games after a 5–1 against the Washington Capitals.

Personal life
Ruff's younger brother, Brent Ruff, was one of four teammates killed in a bus crash while playing for the Swift Current Broncos in 1986.

Another younger brother, Marty Ruff, was a first round draft pick of the St. Louis Blues, but never appeared in an NHL game.

An older brother, Randy Ruff, played and coached in junior hockey.

Ruff and his wife Gaye have four children: Brett, Eryn and twins Madeline and Brian. The Ruffs' primary residence is in Clarence, New York.

Career statistics

Regular season and playoffs

Head coaching record

See also
 Captain (ice hockey)
 List of NHL head coaches
 List of NHL coach statistical leaders

References

External links
 

1960 births
Living people
Buffalo Sabres captains
Buffalo Sabres coaches
Buffalo Sabres draft picks
Buffalo Sabres players
Canada men's national ice hockey team coaches
Canadian ice hockey coaches
Canadian ice hockey forwards
Canadian people of Ukrainian descent
Dallas Stars coaches
Florida Panthers coaches
Ice hockey people from Alberta
Jack Adams Award winners
Lethbridge Broncos players
National Hockey League assistant coaches
New Jersey Devils coaches
New York Rangers coaches
New York Rangers players
Rochester Americans players
San Diego Gulls (IHL) players
Taber Golden Suns players